Rodolfo Loza (born 21 October 1933) is an Argentine boxer. He competed in the men's middleweight event at the 1960 Summer Olympics. At the 1960 Summer Olympics, he lost to Carlos Lucas of Chile.

References

1933 births
Living people
Argentine male boxers
Olympic boxers of Argentina
Boxers at the 1960 Summer Olympics
Boxers from Buenos Aires
Middleweight boxers